Milas is a city in south-west Turkey.

Milas may also refer to:
 Milas, Iran, a village in Chaharmahal and Bakhtiari Province, Iran
 Milas Rural District, in Chaharmahal and Bakhtiari Province, Iran 
 Milaș, a commune in Bistriţa-Năsăud County, Romania
 Miles (bishop of Susa), also spelled Milas
 MILAS, an anti-submarine version of the Italian Otomat missile

Fictional entities
 Milas, an Azure Striker Gunvolt 2 character

See also
 Mila (disambiguation)